Njegoš (Montenegrin Cyrillic | Његош) is a mountain in Montenegro. This mountain is 1,725 meters high. The bigger part of this mountain is in vegetation, while the northern end is mostly barren.

The Petrović-Njegoš dynasty received its second name after this mountain. 

Mountains of Montenegro
Petrović-Njegoš dynasty